The Sears, Roebuck and Company Store, at 800 West Broadway in Louisville, Kentucky, is a building which was listed on the National Register of Historic Places in 1983.

It was deemed notable as "one of few structures in Louisville and the only major commercial/retail building constructed in the Art Deco style. Built in 1928, the structure incorporates features characteristic of the style, including strong vertical elements and geometric patterns in the detailing."

References

National Register of Historic Places in Louisville, Kentucky
Commercial buildings on the National Register of Historic Places in Kentucky
Commercial buildings in Louisville, Kentucky
Sears Holdings buildings and structures
Retail buildings in Kentucky
Art Deco architecture in Kentucky
1928 establishments in Kentucky
Commercial buildings completed in 1928